Wilmeth Sidat-Singh (February 13, 1918 – May 9, 1943) was a U.S. Army Air Corps officer with the Tuskegee Airmen, and an American basketball and football player who was subject to segregation in college and professional sports in the 1930s.

Early life
His parents were both African-American. After the death of his father, Elias Webb (a pharmacist), his mother, Pauline, married Samuel Sidat-Singh, a medical student from India who adopted Wilmeth, giving him his family name. After his graduation from Howard University, Dr. Sidat-Singh moved the family to Harlem and set up a family medical practice. 
Wilmeth showed great talent as an athlete and became a basketball star, leading DeWitt Clinton High School to the New York Public High School Athletic League championship in 1934.

Basketball, Football, Law Enforcement Career
Sidat-Singh received an offer of a basketball scholarship from Syracuse University and enrolled in 1935. Former lacrosse coach Roy Simmons Sr. saw him playing an intramural football game and asked him to join the football team. Sidat-Singh starred for Syracuse, playing a position equivalent to modern-day quarterback and starring for the basketball team as well.

Syracuse University and nearby Cornell University were among the first collegiate football teams to include African-American players as starting backfield players. A 1938 news report in the Baltimore Sun reports on one such game where Sidat-Singh led Syracuse to victory over Cornell. In that era, when games were played in Southern segregation states, African-American players from Northern schools were banned from the field. Because of his light complexion and name, Sidat-Singh was sometimes assumed to be a "Hindu" (as people from India were often called by Americans during this time). However. shortly before a game against the University of Maryland, a black sportswriter, Sam Lacy, wrote an article in the Baltimore Afro-American, revealing Sidat-Singh's true racial identity. Wilmeth Sidat-Singh was held out of the game and Syracuse lost that game 0-13. In a rematch the following year at Syracuse, Sidat-Singh led the Orange to a lopsided victory (53-0) over Maryland.

With unofficial bans on black players enacted in both the National Basketball League (NBL) and National Football League (NFL) Sidat-Singh played briefly for a professional barnstorming basketball team in Syracuse and then joined the Metropolitan Police Department of the District of Columbia.

Military Career, Tuskegee Airmen, Death
After U.S. entry into World War II, he applied and was accepted as a member of the Tuskegee Airmen, the only African-American unit in the U.S. Army Air Force, and won his wings as a pilot.

Sidat-Singh died in 1943 during a training mission when the engine of his airplane failed. "He died on a training flight when his stricken plane went down in Saginaw Bay, his parachute tangled in the fuselage." He drowned in Lake Huron.

Legacy

In 2005, Syracuse University honored Wilmeth Sidat-Singh by retiring his number and hanging his basketball jersey (#19) in the rafters of the Carrier Dome.

On Saturday, Nov. 9, 2013, the University of Maryland publicly apologized to surviving relatives from the Webb family at a ceremony during a football game with Syracuse University.

Fraternity Membership

Wilmeth Sidat-Singh was a member of Omega Psi Phi fraternity initiated into Kappa chapter on May 2, 1938. The original initiation document has a poem written about Sidat.

See also
 Dogfights (TV series)
 Executive Order 9981
 Freeman Field Mutiny
 List of Tuskegee Airmen
 Military history of African Americans
 The Tuskegee Airmen (movie)
 Tuskegee Airmen

References

External links
 Player Bio @ orangehoops.org

1918 births
1943 deaths
American football quarterbacks
Metropolitan Police Department of the District of Columbia officers
Syracuse Orange men's basketball players
Syracuse Orange football players
Tuskegee Airmen
United States Army Air Forces officers
Basketball players from Washington, D.C.
Players of American football from New York (state)
Basketball players from New York City
African-American players of American football
African-American basketball players
Military personnel from Washington, D.C.
Military personnel from New York City
DeWitt Clinton High School alumni
American men's basketball players
African-American aviators
Aviators from Washington, D.C.
Aviators from New York (state)
United States Army Air Forces personnel killed in World War II
Aviators killed in aviation accidents or incidents in the United States
Players of American football from Washington, D.C.
Victims of aviation accidents or incidents in 1943
20th-century African-American sportspeople